Karl Joseph Leiprecht (11 September 1903 – 29 October 1981) was the Bishop of Rottenburg.

Born in the town of Hauerz (now Bad Wurzach) in the Allgäu, Leiprecht studied philosophy and theology at the University of Tübingen from 1923 to 1927.  On 24 March 1928 he was ordained a priest by Bishop Johannes Baptista Sproll at Rottenburg Cathedral. Over the next five years, he served as a vicar at Holy Cross Minster in Schwäbisch Gmünd and at St. George's Church in Stuttgart.

Leiprecht served as the city priest of Rottweil from 1942 to 1947 before becoming vicar capitular at Rottenburg Cathedral.
On 7 October 1948 he was named Titular Bishop of Scyrus and Auxiliary Bishop of Rottenburg; he was consecrated bishop on November 30 by Archbishop Wendelin Rauch at Rottenburg Cathedral.  The next year, Leiprecht was elected the Bishop of Rottenburg on 21 June, Pius XII officially named him to the post on 4 July and he was enthroned on 8 September. He resigned from the office of bishop on 4 June 1974 and died in 1981 in Ravensburg.

Genealogy Information about the "Leiprecht" Family : http://www.leiprecht.de/

1903 births
1981 deaths
People from Ravensburg (district)
People from the Kingdom of Württemberg
Roman Catholic bishops of Rottenburg
20th-century German Roman Catholic bishops
Participants in the Second Vatican Council
Knights Commander of the Order of Merit of the Federal Republic of Germany
20th-century German Roman Catholic priests